Hemiliostraca auricincta is a species of sea snail, a marine gastropod mollusk in the family Eulimidae.

Distribution
This marine species occurs off the following locations:

 Aruba
 Belize
 Bonaire
 Caribbean Sea
 Cayman Islands
 Colombia
 Costa Rica
 Cuba
 Curaçao
 Gulf of Mexico
 Lesser Antilles
 Mexico
 Puerto Rico

Description 
The maximum recorded shell length is 4.9 mm.

Habitat 
Minimum recorded depth is 0 m. Maximum recorded depth is 183 m.

References

External links
 Rosenberg, G.; Moretzsohn, F.; García, E. F. (2009). Gastropoda (Mollusca) of the Gulf of Mexico, Pp. 579–699 in: Felder, D.L. and D.K. Camp (eds.), Gulf of Mexico–Origins, Waters, and Biota. Texas A&M Press, College Station, Texas

Eulimidae
Gastropods described in 1958
Taxa named by Robert Tucker Abbott